Sun Li (16 October 1949 - 9 May 2010) was a Chinese novelist. He was a member of the Chinese Communist Party. He was a recipient of one of the most prestigious literature prizes in China, the Mao Dun Literature Prize.

Biography
Sun was born in Guangxi in 1949, with his ancestral home in Ding County, Hebei. His birth name was Sun Shengli.

Sun worked in Inner Mongolia Production and Construction Corps in 1969. Sun graduated from Tianjin Normal University in 1974. He started to publish novels in 1984.

Sun died in Tianjin in 2010.

Works

Novels
 Rhapsody of Metropolis (co-author: Yu Xiaohui)
 English translation: Metropolis translated by David Kwan. Beijing: Panda Books, 1992.
 Wishing We Last Forever (co-author: Yu Xiaohui)

Awards
 Rhapsody of Metropolis - 3rd Mao Dun Literature Prize (1991)

Personal life
Sun married Yu Xiaohui, who is also a famous novelist, they collaborated on the novel, Rhapsody of Metropolis.

References

1949 births
2010 deaths
Tianjin Normal University alumni
Writers from Guangxi
20th-century novelists
Mao Dun Literature Prize laureates
Chinese male novelists
20th-century Chinese male writers